The 1909–10 United States collegiate men's ice hockey season was the 16th season of collegiate ice hockey.

Regular season

Standings

References

1909–10 NCAA Standings

External links
College Hockey Historical Archives

 
College